is a Japanese former professional baseball pitcher. He played with the Chiba Lotte Marines and the Orix Buffaloes in Japan's Nippon Professional Baseball from 2008 to 2013.

External links

1980 births
Living people
Baseball people from Kobe
Japanese baseball players
Chiba Lotte Marines players
Orix Buffaloes players